Vyazemsky is a town and the administrative center of Vyazemsky District in Khabarovsk Krai, Russia, located  southwest of Khabarovsk, the administrative center of the krai, close to the Ussuri River and the border with China. Population:

History
It was founded in 1895 as a settlement during the construction of the railway between Khabarovsk and Vladivostok, which later became the easternmost section of the Trans-Siberian Railway. The settlement and the station were initially named Vyazemskaya after the lead engineer of the section, Orest Vyazemsky.

Urban-type settlement status was granted to it in 1938; town status was granted in 1951.

Administrative and municipal status
Within the framework of administrative divisions, Vyazemsky serves as the administrative center of Vyazemsky District, to which it is directly subordinated. As a municipal division, the town of Vyazemsky is incorporated within Vyazemsky Municipal District as Vyazemsky Urban Settlement.

Economy
The town's economy relies on the production of timber, foodstuffs, and construction materials, as well as on the Trans-Siberian Railway traffic.

Transportation

The town is served by Vyazemskaya railway station on the Trans-Siberian Railway and is the terminus for electrified suburban commuter trains from Khabarovsk. It is also on the M60 motorway.

References

Notes

Sources

Cities and towns in Khabarovsk Krai
1895 establishments in the Russian Empire